Luciano Alves Barbosa (born 30 December 1976 in Rio Grande, Rio Grande do Sul) is a professional male squash player who represented Brazil during his career. He reached a career-high world ranking of World No. 120 in February 2004 after having joined the Professional Squash Association in 1999.

References

External links
 

1976 births
Living people
Brazilian male squash players
Pan American Games silver medalists for Brazil
Pan American Games bronze medalists for Brazil
Pan American Games medalists in squash
Squash players at the 2003 Pan American Games
Squash players at the 2007 Pan American Games
Sportspeople from Rio Grande do Sul
Medalists at the 2003 Pan American Games
Medalists at the 2007 Pan American Games